is a passenger railway station located in  Isogo-ku, Yokohama, Kanagawa Prefecture, Japan, operated by the private railway company Keikyū.

Lines
Sugita Station is served by the Keikyū Main Line and is located 34.3 kilometers from the terminus of the line at Shinagawa Station in Tokyo.

Station layout
The station consists of two elevatedopposed side platforms with the station building underneath.

Platforms

Sugita Station is an elevated station with dual opposed side platforms serving two tracks.

History
Sugita Station was opened on July 10, 1930 as a stop on the Shōnan Electric Railway, which merged with the Keihin ELectric Railway on November 1, 1941. It was elevated to a full station on May 1, 1931. A new elevated station building was erected in March 1970, and a completely new station building was completed in April 1993.

Keikyū introduced station numbering to its stations on 21 October 2010; Sugita Station was assigned station number KK46.

Passenger statistics
In fiscal 2019, the station was used by an average of 33,761 passengers daily. 

The passenger figures for previous years are as shown below.

Surrounding area
 Shin-Sugita Station
 Tōzen-ji

See also
 List of railway stations in Japan

References

External links

 

Railway stations in Kanagawa Prefecture
Railway stations in Japan opened in 1930
Keikyū Main Line
Railway stations in Yokohama